Chelsea High School may refer to:

Chelsea High School (Alabama), Chelsea, Alabama
Chelsea High School (Massachusetts), Chelsea, Massachusetts
Chelsea High School (Michigan), Chelsea, Michigan
Chelsea High School (Oklahoma), Chelsea, Oklahoma
Chelsea High School (New York), New York, New York